Katarina Vitaliivna Zavatska (born 5 February 2000) is a Ukrainian tennis player.
Zavatska has a career-high singles ranking of world No. 103, achieved on 3 February 2020, and a career-high doubles ranking of 337, reached on 14 June 2021. She has won six singles and two doubles titles at tournaments of the ITF Circuit.

On the ITF Junior Circuit, Zavatska has a career-high ranking of No. 13, achieved on 18 July 2016. She reached the quarterfinals of the 2016 French Open girls' singles, losing to eventual champion Rebeka Masarova.

Career
Zavatska made her WTA Tour main-draw debut at the 2017 Malaysian Open, where she was given a wildcard to compete against Magda Linette.

She won her first WTA tournament match at the 2018 Morocco Open, where she beat wildcard Diae El Jardi, in straight sets. Then, she went on to win her second-round match in three sets, against lucky loser Alexandra Dulgheru.

Performance timeline

Only main-draw results in WTA Tour, Grand Slam tournaments, Fed Cup/Billie Jean King Cup and Olympic Games are included in win–loss records.

Singles
Current after the 2023 Australian Open.

Doubles

ITF Circuit finals

Singles: 13 (6 titles, 7 runner-ups)

Doubles: 3 (2 titles, 1 runner-up)

Head-to-head record

Record against top-10 players
Active players are in boldface.

Record against No. 11–20 players
Active players are in boldface.

  Yanina Wickmayer 1–1
  Beatriz Haddad Maia 1–1
  Kirsten Flipkens 0–1
  Markéta Vondroušová 0–1
  Elena Rybakina 0–2
  Veronika Kudermetova 0–2

Notes

References

External links
 
 
 

2000 births
Living people
Ukrainian female tennis players
Sportspeople from Lutsk
Sportspeople from Volyn Oblast
21st-century Ukrainian women